Ampelocera is a genus of low- to mid-elevation rainforest trees of the family Ulmaceae that occur from Mexico to Brazil.

Species include: 
Ampelocera albertiae Todzia
Ampelocera crenulata Urb.
Ampelocera cubensis Griseb.
Ampelocera edentula Kuhlm.
Ampelocera glabra Kuhlm.
Ampelocera hondurensis Donn.
Ampelocera hottlei (Standl.) Standl.
Ampelocera latifolia Ducke
Ampelocera longissima Todzia
Ampelocera macphersonii Todzia
Ampelocera macrocarpa Forero & A.H. Gentry
Ampelocera pubescens C.V. Morton
Ampelocera ruizii Klotzsch
Ampelocera verrucosa Kuhlm.

References

 
Rosales genera